Devinyl Splits No. 5 is a split album between Owen and Kevin Devine. This is the 5th release in the series of the Devinyl Splits. Devinyl Splits is a six-part split 7-inch series featuring Kevin Devine and friends.

Track listing

Personnel 
Owen
 Mike Kinsella – guitar, vocals, drums, bass

Kevin Devine
 Kevin Devine – guitar, vocals

Production
 Neil Strauch – engineering, mixing (tracks 1)
 Kevin Devine – engineering, mixing (tracks 2)
 Jesse Cannon – mastering (tracks 1 & 2)
 Matt Delisle – art direction, design

References

External links 
 

2015 EPs
Owen (musician) EPs
Split EPs